Deep Dish may refer to:
Deep Dish (duo), a duo of DJs and house music producers
Deep Dish (novel), a 2008 romance novel 
Deep dish pizza, a deep-dish pizza style developed in Chicago, United States